Connected Development Initiative (CODE), is a Nigerian not-for-profit founded in 2012, and focused on empowering marginalized communities to demand goods and services by creating platforms for dialogue and building citizens’ capacity to hold their government accountable through its Follow The Money (FTM) initiative.

History
Connected Development started as a community activism and grassroots mobilization. In 2012, the founder, Hamzat Lawal was grieved by the lead poisoning that took place in Zamfara state two years earlier. When he realized that nobody was talking about the disaster and the people affected after killing more than 400 people, he embarked on a 14 hours journey to the community, Bagega, where the incident took place in order to learn more about the aftermath of the problem.

This propelled him towards community activism and to start a grassroots movement known as follows The Money, using data to hold government accountable, and demanding action from government agencies.  CODE has worked to improve public governance in Nigeria and across Africa by empowering marginalized communities to demand high levels of accountability and transparency from the government. Since its inception, it has been awarded various grants to carry out community development and citizen empowerment of marginalised communities.

Vision and missions
CODE envision a world where all people even in the most remote areas of the globe can hold their government accountable.

Work and Achievements

 In 2012, Connected Development initiated Follow The Money Campaign, an initiative that leverages technology and open data to track public funds and holds government accountable. The campaign started as a follow-up to No. SaveBagega, which brought the crisis scenario front and center to government officials who were able to channel resources to Bagega. Through Follow the Money (FTM), connected development and partners mobilize more young people to use technology to document and amplify voices and hold governments to account. FTM currently has 6,000 members from the 774 local government areas in Nigeria.
 CODE partners with Budgit to track COVID-19 Intervention Funds in 10 African countries
 In 2021, CODE tracked 23 constituency projects worth N1.2 billion in Kaduna state.
 Since inception, CODE has tracked about $113.6 million budgeted for projects across 181 communities in 25 states in the country

Supporters and Partners
 Luminate Group
 MacAuthur Foundation
 Ford Foundation
 Skoll Foundation

See also
Akin Fadeyi Foundation

References

 

2012 establishments in Nigeria
Companies established in 2012
Information technology companies of Nigeria
Technology companies established in 2012